Kriangkrai Pimrat (born February 20, 1987) is a Thai professional footballer who plays for Thai League 3 club Banbueng.
He played for Chonburi FC in the 2008 AFC Champions League group stages.

Honours

Club
Chonburi F.C.
 Thailand Premier League Champions (1) : 2007
 Kor Royal Cup Winner (3) : 2008, 2009, 2011
 Thai FA Cup Winner (1) : 2010

References

1987 births
Living people
Kriangkrai Pimrat
Kriangkrai Pimrat
Association football midfielders
Kriangkrai Pimrat
Kriangkrai Pimrat
Kriangkrai Pimrat
Kriangkrai Pimrat
Kriangkrai Pimrat
Kriangkrai Pimrat
Kriangkrai Pimrat